Alexandria Airport may refer to:

 Alexandria Airport (Greece) in Alexandria, Greece (ICAO: LGAX)
 Alexandria Airport (Indiana) in Alexandria, Indiana, United States (FAA: I99)
 Alexandria Airport (New Jersey) in Pittstown, Alexandria Township, New Jersey, United States (FAA: N85)
 Alexandria Aerodrome in Alexandria, Ontario, Canada (TC: CNS4)
 Alexandria International Airport (Egypt) or El Nouzha Airport in Alexandria, Egypt (IATA: ALY, ICAO: HEAX)
 Alexandria International Airport (Louisiana) in Alexandria, Louisiana, United States (FAA/IATA: AEX)
 Alexandria Municipal Airport (Chandler Field) in Alexandria, Minnesota, United States (FAA/IATA: AXN)

Airports in places named Alexandria:

 Borg El Arab Airport serving Alexandria, Egypt (IATA: HBE, ICAO: HEBA)
 Esler Regional Airport in Alexandria, Louisiana, United States (FAA/IATA: ESF)